The Quartermaster School (QMS) is a subordinate command of the United States Army's Combined Arms Support Command and is located at Fort Lee, Virginia.

Shoulder Sleeve Insignia

Description
On a buff lozenge shaped field with rounded points, 2 inches (5.08 cm) in width and 3 inches (7.62 cm) in height overall, a blue (ultramarine) torch with blue flames surmounted by a blue key and blue sword crossed in saltire.

Symbolism
Buff and blue are the colors of the Quartermaster Corps. The key and sword are taken from the Quartermaster Corps insignia.  The torch signifies knowledge and alludes to training in Quartermaster.

Background
The shoulder sleeve insignia was originally approved for the Quartermaster Training Command on 7 Nov 1956. It was redesignated for the U.S. Army Quartermaster School on 23 Oct 1962. On 24 Nov 1975 the insignia was amended to change the colors of the insignia.

Distinctive Unit Insignia

Description
Buff, a bend Azure fimbriated Argent, between in sinister chief the Liberty Bell and in dexter base the Lamp of Knowledge upon a closed book, all Proper (bronze bell, dark oak yoke, black iron bolts and straps; bronze lamp, red flame, blue book with gold lines and edges).

Symbolism
The distinctive insignia is the shield of the coat of arms of the U.S. Army Quartermaster School. The shield is buff, the color of the Quartermaster Corps, which with the blue bend gives the colonial colors and indicates the early organization of the Corps. The Liberty Bell suggests the city which gave birth to the Corps and in which the School originated.

Background
The distinctive unit insignia was originally approved for the Quartermaster Corps School on 16 Dec 1929.  It was redesignated for the U.S. Army Quartermaster School on 20 Dec 1967. On 9 Jun 1981 the insignia was amended to extend authorization for wear to personnel assigned to the U.S. Army Quartermaster Center.

Device

Blazon

Shield
Buff, a bend Azure fimbriated Argent, between in sinister chief the Liberty Bell and in dexter base the Lamp of Knowledge upon a closed book, all Proper (bronze bell, dark oak yoke, black iron bolts and straps; bronze lamp, red flame, blue book with gold lines and edges).

Crest
On a wreath of the colors (Argent and Buff) the insignia of the Quartermaster Corps Proper (as of 1925).

Motto
FAMAM EXTENDIMUS FACTIS (We Spread Our Fame by Our Deeds).

Symbolism
The shield is buff, the color of the Quartermaster Corps which with the blue bend gives the colonial colors and indicates the early organization of the Corps. The Liberty Bell suggests the city which gave birth to the Corps and in which the School originated.

Background
The device was originally approved for the Quartermaster School on 7 May 1925. It was redesignated for the U.S. Army Quartermaster School on 20 Dec 1967. On 10 Apr 1986 the device was amended to correct the wording of the blazon for the crest.

Flags 
The flag for the U.S. Army Quartermaster School is buff with light blue fringe. The device of the School is centered on the flag (TIOH drawing 5 January 245). The flag for the U.S. Army Quartermaster Center is buff with light blue fringe. The insignia for the Quartermaster Center is centered on the flag (TIOH drawing 5-1-76).

Structure
Quartermaster Center and School
 23rd Quartermaster Brigade
 HHC, 23rd Quartermaster Brigade
 244th Quartermaster Battalion
Companies A, W, P, G
 262nd Quartermaster Battalion
Companies C (Airborne), J, R, U, V
 266th Quartermaster Battalion
Companies B, T, 
United States Marine Corps Detachment
United States Air Force Detachment
United States Navy Detachment

External links
 United States Army Quartermaster Corps
 

Buildings and structures in Prince George County, Virginia
Center and School
United States Army schools
Education in Prince George County, Virginia